The Board of Revenue of Sindh, Pakistan is responsible for collecting all tax revenue of the Government of Sindh. Board of Revenue is the Controlling authority in all matters connected with the administration of Revenue collection including land taxes, land revenue, preparation of land record and other matters relating to providing relief to those affected by calamites. 

The department is headed by the senior member. It is an extremely influential BPS-21 post and wields tremendous power. Currently the office of the senior m Below the senior member in hierarchy comes the secretary board of revenue. Munawar Ali Mahesar, an officer of ex-PCS, BS—19, has held the post of secretary board of revenue Sindh for 3 times, the highest number by any officer.

External links 
 http://borsindh.gov.pk/ Board of Revenue, Sindh

Government agencies of Sindh